Scymnus marinus, is a species of beetle found in the family Coccinellidae described by Étienne Mulsant in 1850. It is found in Western Europe, mainly France and Spain.

References 

Coccinellidae
Beetles described in 1850
Taxa named by Étienne Mulsant